Caucasian Albanian (also called Old Udi, Aluan or Aghwan) is an extinct member of the Northeast Caucasian languages. It was spoken in Caucasian Albania, which stretched from current day south Dagestan to Azerbaijan. Linguists believe it is an early linguistic predecessor to the endangered North Caucasian Udi language. The distinct Caucasian Albanian alphabet used 52 letters.

Caucasian Albanian possibly corresponds to the "Gargarian" language identified by medieval Armenian historians. Despite its name, Caucasian Albanian bears no linguistic relationship whatsoever with Albanian, the modern Indo-European language of Albania.

Discovery and decipherment
The existence of the Caucasian Albanian literature was known only indirectly before the late 20th century. Koryun's Life of Mashtots, written in the 5th century but only surviving in much later corrupted manuscripts, and Movses Kaghankatvatsi's History of the Caucasian Albanians, written in the 10th century, attribute the conversion of the Caucasian Albanians to Christianity to two missionaries, Enoch and Dana, and the creation of the Caucasian Albanian alphabet to the Armenian scholar Mesrop Mashtots. A certain Bishop Jeremiah then translated the Christian Bible into their language. As recently as 1977, Bruce Metzger could write that "nothing of [this] version has survived".

In 1996, Zaza Aleksidze of the Centre of Manuscripts in Tbilisi, Georgia, discovered a palimpsest at Saint Catherine's Monastery on Mount Sinai, Egypt, with an unknown script. He went on to identify the alphabet as Caucasian Albanian, and to identify the manuscript as an early Christian lectionary from about the 5th or 6th century. The lectionary may be the earliest extant lectionary in the Christian religion.

Then linguists Jost Gippert and Wolfgang Schulze got involved with the Caucasian Albanian alphabet. Specialized x-ray equipment was used, which made it possible to read the Caucasian Albanian palimpsest texts in their entirety. A list of Caucasian Albanian month names, which survived in a number of medieval manuscripts, gave one of the clues to the language. In 2017, two additional texts of Caucasian Albanian were discovered in Saint Catherine's Monastery. The original text on the palimpsests was erased anywhere between the 4th and 12th century.

Texts
The deciphered text of the lectionary includes excerpts from the Hebrew Bible (Psalms and Isaiah) and from the New Testament (Acts of the Apostles the gospels of Matthew, Mark and Luke, and the epistles of Romans, 1 Corinthians, 2 Corinthians, Galatians, Ephesians, 1 Thessalonians, 2 Thessalonians, 1 Timothy, 2 Timothy, Hebrews, 2 Peter, 1 John and James). Text from the Gospel of John, separate from the lectionary, was also found. Its text proved much more difficult to recover and on some pages it can only be identified by the Eusebian canons at the bottom of the page. This was likely a complete gospel originally, and it is possible that the whole Bible had at some point been translated into Caucasian Albanian.

The Caucasian Albanian translation of the Bible relies predominantly on Old Armenian translations, but it deviates from the known Armenian text in several places, suggesting that the original Greek and possibly Georgian and Syriac translations were also used as source texts.

Apart from the Caucasian Albanian palimpsests kept at Mt. Sinai, the most famous samples of Caucasian Albanian inscriptions were found in 1949 during excavations in Mingachevir region, Azerbaijan. Among the known Caucasian Albanian words are zow (I), own (and) and avel-om (much, ordinal form).

Phonology

Consonants

Vowels

References

Udi language
Northeast Caucasian languages
Languages attested from the 6th century
Languages extinct in the 8th century